August Frederik Hollming (in Russian 'Golming'; 3 December 1854 – after 1915) was a Finnish silver- and goldsmith, and a Fabergé workmaster.

Life

Hollming was born in Loppi, Finland, the son of a bookkeeper, Anders Gustaf Hollming of Lovisa, and of Katarina Petterson of Nykarleby. Hollming was apprenticed to the goldsmith Carl Friedrich Ekholm in Helsinki at the beginning of the 1870s. In 1876, he settled in St.Petersburg and registered as a goldworker.

In 1880, he qualified as a master and opened his workshop at 35 Kazanskaya Street; he was soon thereafter hired by Fabergé. He had three sons with Erika Gustava Abrahamsson (1856—1909). 
In 1900, the Hollming workshop moved to 24 Bolshaya Morskaya, under the same roof as Fabergé. He mainly produced cigarette cases in silver, gold, and enamel; miniature Easter Egg; and small gem-set, enameled jewels such as cuff-links, brooches, and pins. Many times he produced these objects for the House of Fabergé. The design of the jewelry was surprisingly modern and ahead of its time.

The eldest son August Väinö Hollming (1885—1934) inherited the workshop after his father's death in 1913. He ran the workshop with Otto Hanhinen, his father's assistant until 1915.

In popular culture
In 2016 his work figured prominently on the British TV series, Antiques Roadshow, when four buttons he made, that were at the bottom of a box someone bought for £2.26, were valued at £1,000 to £1,500.

Further reading 
 Ulla Tillander-Godenhielm, Fabergén suomalaiset mestarit (Fabergé's Finnish masters) (2011), pp. 169–174.

References

1854 births
1915 deaths
People from Loppi
Finnish goldsmiths
Finnish silversmiths
Fabergé workmasters
Finnish people from the Russian Empire